Yakov Kazak (born 1 August 1985) is a retired Belarusian footballer who last played for Smolevichi-STI.

External links
 
 

1985 births
Living people
Belarusian footballers
FC Slavia Mozyr players
FC SKVICH Minsk players
FC Baranovichi players
FC Smorgon players
FC Smolevichi players
FC Rudziensk players
Association football midfielders